Qikiqtaruk Territorial Park, is a park in Yukon Territory, Canada. The park makes up the entire 116 square kilometers of Herschel Island. The island is located in the north of Yukon in the Beaufort Sea. The park is known for its large colony of black guillemots.

References

External links 
Herschel Island - Qikiqtaruk Territorial Park | Government of Yukon

Parks in Yukon